Gaziosmanpaşa Stadium is a multi-use stadium in Tokat, Turkey.  It is currently used mostly for football matches and is the home stadium of Tokatspor.  The stadium was opened in 1984 and holds 5,762 people.

References

External links

Stadium information

Sports venues completed in 1984
Football venues in Turkey
Sport in Tokat